Parydra is a genus of shore flies in the family Ephydridae. There are at least 70 described species in Parydra.

Species
These 76 species belong to the genus Parydra:

P. abbreviata Loew, 1861 i c g
P. acuta Clausen and Cook, 1971 i c g
P. alajensis Krivosheina, 1989 c g
P. albipulvis Miyagi, 1977 c g
P. alpina (Cresson, 1924) i c g
P. appendiculata Loew, 1878 i c g
P. aquila (Fallén, 1813) i c g b
P. arctica Clausen and Cook, 1971 i c g
P. articulata Canzoneri & Meneghini, 1981 c g
P. aurata Jones, 1906 i c g
P. aureola Cresson, 1931 c g
P. borealis (Cresson, 1949) i c g
P. breviceps Loew, 1862 i c g
P. buccata Becker, 1914 c g
P. bucculenta Loew, 1862 c g
P. cishumilis Clausen, 1985 c g
P. coarctata (Fallén, 1813) c g
P. cognata Loew, 1860 c g
P. copis Clausen and Cook, 1971 i c g
P. flavitarsis (Dahl, 1964) c g
P. formosana Cresson, 1937 c g
P. fossarum (Haliday, 1833) c g
P. halteralis (Cresson, 1930) i c g
P. hamata Clausen and Cook, 1971 i c g
P. hecate (Haliday, 1833) c g
P. humilis Williston, 1897 i c g
P. imitans Loew, 1878 i c g
P. incommoda Cresson, 1930 i c g
P. inornata Becker, 1924 c g
P. japonica Miyagi, 1977 c g
P. joaquinensis Clausen & Cook, 1971 c g
P. lingulata Clausen and Cook, 1971 i c g
P. littoralis (Meigen, 1830) c g
P. lutumilis Miyagi, 1977 c g
P. lynetteae Clausen & Cook, 1971 c g
P. mitis (Cresson, 1930) c g
P. neozelandica Tonnoir & Malloch, 1926 c g
P. nigripes (Cresson, 1918) c g
P. nigritarsis Strobl, 1893 c g
P. nubecula Becker, 1896 c g
P. ochropus (Thomson, 1869) c g
P. ozerovi Krivosheina, 1989 c g
P. pacifica Miyagi, 1977 c g
P. parasocia Clausen and Cook, 1971 i c g
P. parva Cresson, 1949 i c g
P. paullula Loew, 1862 i c g
P. pedalis Clausen and Cook, 1971 i c g
P. penabbreviata Clausen and Cook, 1971 i c g
P. penisica Clausen and Cook, 1971 i c g
P. pinguis (Walker, 1852) i c g
P. pubera Loew, 1860 c g
P. pulvisa Miyagi, 1977 c g
P. pusilla (Meigen, 1830) c g
P. quadriloba Clausen and Cook, 1971 i c g
P. quadripunctata (Meigen, 1830) c g
P. quadrituberculata Loew, 1862 i c g b
P. quinquemaculata Becker, 1896 c g
P. raffonei Canzoneri, 1986 c g
P. ralloi Canzoneri & Meneghini, 1978 c g
P. socia (Cresson, 1934) i c g
P. spiculosa Clausen, 1985 c g
P. spinosa Clausen and Cook, 1971 i c g
P. stagnicola Robineau-Desvoidy, 1830 c g
P. succurva Clausen and Cook, 1971 i c g
P. taurrensis Canzoneri, 1980 c g
P. transversa Cresson, 1940 i c g
P. truncatula Clausen, 1985 c g
P. tuberculifera Lamb, 1912 c g
P. turkmenica Krivosheina, 1989 c g
P. undulata Becker, 1896 c g
P. unicolor (Becker, 1926) c g
P. unituberculata Loew, 1878 i c g
P. vanduzeei (Cresson, 1933) i c g
P. varia Loew, 1863 i c g
P. villosissima Giordani Soika, 1956 c g
P. vulgaris (Cresson, 1949) i c g

Data sources: i = ITIS, c = Catalogue of Life, g = GBIF, b = Bugguide.net

References

Further reading

External links

 

Ephydridae
Articles created by Qbugbot
Schizophora genera